Down Every Road 1962–1994 is a compilation album by American country singer Merle Haggard, released in 1996. It covers music from his earliest work in the early 1960s to his Epic releases of the late 1980s. The boxed set includes three CDs of material recorded for Capitol (up to 1977) and one of Haggard's later MCA and Epic recordings.

Composition
Down Every Road 1962–1994 comprises 100 songs recorded from 1962 through 1994, across four CDs. Each CD represents a different period of Haggard's career. The first CD includes songs from 1962 through 1967, when Haggard released his first few albums with Capitol Records. After a three year stint in San Quentin State Prison, Haggard rekindled his interest in music, and became one of the leading artists in the Bakersfield sound genre. The CD contains some of Haggard's first hit singles, such as "(My Friends Are Gonna Be) Strangers", "The Fugitive", and "Branded Man". The latter two songs contain semi-autobiographical lyrics about prison, which is a common theme found on many songs from the first CD. Additionally, the CD contains some of Haggard's first known recordings with Talley Records, such as "Skid Row" and "Sing A Sad Song".

Critical reception

Stephen Thomas Erlewine of AllMusic deems the album "not just the perfect Merle Haggard box set, it's one of the greatest box sets ever released as well, since it truly presents all sides of its subject, while offering nothing but sheer pleasure in terms of mere listening. " Robert Hillburn of the Los Angeles Times wrote: "Merle Haggard writes of troubled souls and sweet dreams with the timeless simplicity of a great folk artist, while singing with the soulfulness and conviction of a classic bluesman. There is also in his body of work the independence and renegade attitude of a legendary rocker. It's no wonder that he is one of the most commanding artists of the modern pop era... The only weakness in this four-disc package is that it shortchanges Haggard's post-Capitol years."

It was ranked at number 477 on the 2012 updated version of Rolling Stones 500 Greatest Albums of All Time, stating that it "is the ultimate collection from one of country's finest singers." It was ranked at number 284 in the 2020 update.

Personnel
 Merle Haggard – vocals, guitar

The Strangers:
 Roy Nichols – lead guitar
 Norman Hamlet – steel guitar
 Tiny Moore – mandolin, fiddle
 Eldon Shamblin– guitar
 Ralph Mooney – steel guitar
 Gene Price – bass
 Gordon Terry - fiddle
 Ronnie Reno – guitar
 Bobby Wayne – guitar
 Marcia Nichols – guitar
 Clint Strong – guitar
 Mark Yeary – piano
 George French – piano
 Dennis Hromek – bass
 James Tittle – bass
 Johnny Meeks - bass
 Jerry Ward – bass
 Wayne Durham – bass
 Biff Adam – drums
 Eddie Burris – drums
 Don Markham – saxophone
 Jimmy Belkin – fiddle
 Gary Church – horns

Tracklist

References

1996 compilation albums
Capitol Records compilation albums
Merle Haggard albums